Konstantin Vasilyevich Dushenko (born October 16, 1946 in Moscow) is a Russian translator, culturologist and historian. His with the Institute of Scientific Information on Social Sciences of the Russian Academy of Sciences. He authored over 30 books on the origins of various quotations, aphorisms, and bon mots.

He  translated various literature from Polish, both works of fiction and scientific works. In particular, he translated many works of Stanisław Lem. For this was he was awarded with the Decoration of Honor Meritorious for Polish Culture.

Dushenko graduated first from the Moscow Tekhnikum of Automatics and Telemechanics and later  from the Moscow State University, department of history. In 1977 he earned Ph.D. with the thesis about the ideology of Warsaw positivism ("Из истории польской буржуазной общественной мысли: Варшавский позитивизм в 1866—1886 гг.").

Books
 Красное и белое: Из истории политического языка. — М.: ИНИОН РАН, 2018
Цитата в пространстве культуры: Из истории цитат и крылатых слов. — М.: ИНИОН РАН, 2019. 
История знаменитых цитат. — М.: Азбука-Аттикус, 2018.
Последние слова знаменитых людей: Легенды и факты. — М.: Эксмо, 2016.
 Большой словарь латинских цитат и выражений. / В соавторстве с Г. Ю. Багриновским. — 2-е изд., испр. и доп.— М.: Азбука-Аттикус, 2017.
 Большой словарь цитат и крылатых выражений. — М.: Эксмо, 2011.
 Всемирная история в изречениях и цитатах. — 2‑е изд., перераб. и доп. — М.: Эксмо, 2008.
 Русская история в изречениях и цитатах. — 2-е изд., перераб. и доп. — М.: Азбука-Аттикус, 2019. (В печати.)
Мысли и изречения древних с указанием источника. — М.: Эксмо, 2003.
 Религия и этика в изречениях и цитатах. — М.: Эксмо, 2009.
 Словарь современных цитат. — 4-е изд., перераб. и доп. — М.: Эксмо, 2006.
 Цитаты из всемирной литературы от Гомера до наших дней. — М.: Эксмо, 2007.
 Цитаты из русской литературы от «Слова о полку…» до Пелевина. — 3‑е изд., испр. и доп. — М.: Азбука-Аттикус, 2019.
 «Большая книга афоризмов» (12-е изд.: М.: Эксмо, 2012; 13-е изд. под загл. "Большая книга мудрости и остроумия": М.: Эксмо, 2015).
 «Мастера афоризма от Возрождения до наших дней» (3-е изд.: М.: Эксмо, 2006),
 «Новая книга афоризмов» (М.: Эксмо, 2009)
Оскар Уайльд. Мысли, афоризмы и фразы с указанием источника.  (2-е изд.: М.: Эксмо, 2013).

References

1946 births
Living people
20th-century Russian historians
Russian translators
21st-century Russian historians
Translators of Stanisław Lem